The Chairman of the International Cricket Council (ICC) is the highest position in the governing body of world cricket. The position was established as an honorary post in 2014 after a revamp of the management of ICC. The president heads the ICC board of directors. Formerly, the ICC president headed the ICC council but that position become a largely honorary post since the changes pushed through to the ICC constitution in 2014 handed control to the so-called 'Big Three', the England and Wales Cricket Board, Board of Control for Cricket in India and Cricket Australia. Former BCCI president N. Srinivasan became the first chairman of ICC on 26 June 2014.

Shashank Manohar resigned as Chairman of the International Cricket Council (ICC) on 30 June 2020, after more than four years in the role. ICC deputy chairman Imran Khwaja was made interim chairman until an election in November. New Zealand administrator Greg Barclay was elected Chairman on 24 November 2020.

List of chairmen

References

External links

Official website of the ICC

Chairmen of the International Cricket Council

Chairman